Angel Grant (born November 24, 1973) is a Neo Soul/ Alternative Singer  who is considered by some an R&B  Singer in the United States She scored chart success in the late 1990s with the single "Lil Red Boat" produced by Jimmy Jam & Terry Lewis and James "Big Jim" Wright . Ms Grant  Co wrote  her entire album titled  “Album “ with the Mega Hit Writers and Producers Jimmy Jam & Terry Lewis and James "Big Jim" Wright . Ms Grant was  the first artist signed to  their newly created label Flyte Tyme Records.  Flyte Tyme Productions is famous for their work with Janet Jackson, Chanté Moore Johnny Gil   SOS Band and Mariah Carey. Her debut album titled Album followed while the debut single was a top twenty hit on the BET network.
2010 Grant Released a Sophomore Album titled “My Journey Back “ Ms Grant wrote and Produced Sophomore Album

Discography
Album (1998)
My Journey Back (2010)

Singles

Singles

References

External links
Official Fansite
Official MySpace Page
Bio at MMGuide.com

American contemporary R&B singers
Living people
1973 births